João Miguel may refer to:

 João Miguel (actor) (born 1970), Brazilian actor
 João Miguel (footballer) (born 1973), Brazilian footballer
 João Manuel Miguel (born 1952), Portuguese amateur boxer
 João Miguel Silva (footballer, born April 1995) (born 1995), Portuguese footballer
 João Miguel Xavier (born 1993), Portuguese footballer